Please Do Not Disturb is a 2010 tri-segmented Iranian anthology film written and directed by Mohsen Abdolvahab, starring Baran Kosari in the lead role. It is produced and cinematographed by Mohammad Ahmadi. It is Abdolvahab's first full length feature film.

It was critically well acclaimed and has won many accolades, including the Silver Award at the 18th Damascus International Film Festival. It was premiered at the 28th Fajr International Film Festival, and was internationally released in 2010 at 15th Busan International Film Festival in South Korea. It was screened at the 7th Dubai International Film Festival, and was the inaugural film at the International Film Festival of Kerala. It was also screened at the International Film Festival of India.

Synopsis
The film is set in contemporary Tehran, and portrays the city life in three distinctive episodes of sentiment, sensitivity and wit. In the first story, we see a young woman who has been beaten by her husband. The woman is about to complain legally, but the husband is concerned about his job and the embarrassment. The next story is about a clergyman whose wallet and documents have been stolen. The clergyman tries to get the documents back from the thief. The last story is the story of an elderly couple whose TV has broken. The couple is alone in the building and is afraid of opening the door to the young repairman.

Cast
Hedayat Hashemi as Clergy
Hamed Behdad as TV Repairer
Baran Kosari as Roushanak
Shirin Yazdanbakhsh as Old Woman
Mohsen Kazemi as Akbar
Afshin Hashemi as Bahram
Majid Forughi as Taxi Driver
Lili Farhadpour as Married Woman
Hadi Amel as Abdarchi
Ali Amel as Soldier

References

External links
 
 

2010 films
Iranian comedy-drama films
2010s Persian-language films
Anthology films
2010 directorial debut films